Mason Springs is an unincorporated community in Charles County, Maryland, United States. The community had a post office from 1890 to 1924.

Araby, a house on the National Register of Historic Places, is located in Mason Springs.

References

Unincorporated communities in Charles County, Maryland
Unincorporated communities in Maryland